Christopher Landon may refer to:

 Christopher Landon (screenwriter) (1911–1961), British novelist and screenwriter
 Christopher Landon (filmmaker) (born 1975), American film director, producer, and screenwriter